The Defense Information School (DINFOS) is a United States Department of Defense (DoD) school located at Fort George G. Meade, Maryland. DINFOS fulfills the Department of Defense's need for an internal corps of professional journalists, broadcasters, and public affairs professionals. Members from all branches of the U.S. military, DoD civilians and international military personnel attend DINFOS for training in public affairs, print journalism, photojournalism, photography, television and radio broadcasting, lithography, equipment maintenance and various forms of multimedia. The American Council on Education recommends college credit for most DINFOS courses.

History
The Army Information School was founded in 1946 at Carlisle Barracks in Carlisle, Pennsylvania. Other branches of the military merged with the Army Information School in 1948 to form the Armed Forces Information School at Fort Slocum, New York. The joint service venture disbanded due to poor enrollment until 1964, when Assistant Secretary of Defense for Public Affairs Arthur Sylvester chartered DINFOS. DINFOS moved to Fort Benjamin Harrison, just outside Indianapolis, Indiana, in 1965 where it remained until its 1995 move to Fort George G. Meade, Maryland.

Training

Leadership courses
The Public Affairs Leadership Department is one of four departments in DINFOS.

The Public Affairs Leadership Department offers the Qualification Course (PAQC), the Joint Expeditionary Course (JEPAC), the Joint Intermediate Course (JIPAC), and the Joint Senior Course (JSPAC).  Courses are offered to military officers, senior enlisted personnel, Department of Defense civilians, and members of coalition partners from around the world who are preparing for or already in billets of public affairs leadership.

The Public Affairs Qualification Course (PAQC) provides those who are new to the public affairs field the fundamentals of public affairs to include military-media relations, the different mediums used to facilitate the flow of accurate and timely information, and how to conduct public affairs operations in support of the command's mission.  In addition, the students are taught the fundamentals of news, journalism, and how to write and copy-edit in accordance with the Associated Press (AP) Styleguide.

The Public Affairs Expeditionary Course is a ten-day, intensive follow-on course to PAQC.  Students are expected to have a basic working knowledge and experience in PA as the course is focused more on the application of PA skills in a field environment.

Journalism courses
Journalism classes feature basic writing skills and include a headline style known at the school as "headline-ese," a style for writing and developing headlines. Students are taught a variety of writing styles and formats such as news, sports and feature writing.

Photojournalism courses focus on composition, exposure and general camera operation skills. Flash photography is introduced in the basic photography course. Students learn advanced photo-editing, composition and other techniques not taught in basic photojournalism classes.

For military journalists, DINFOS offers the 6-month Mass Communication Fundamentals Course (MCF), two-week Intermediate Public Affairs Specialist Course (IPASC) and four-week Content Management Course. U.S. Army students are awarded the Military Occupational Specialty (MOS) designator of 46S, Mass Communications Specialist, U.S. Air Force students are awarded the Air Force Specialty Code (AFSC) 3N0X6, Public Affairs, and U.S. Marine Corps students are awarded the MOS 4341 Combat Correspondent.

For military Broadcast journalists, DINFOS offers the Broadcast Communication Specialist Course. Broadcasters begin by attending several weeks of BWAS - Basic Writing and Announcing Skills. If the class requirements are met, students may continue into Radio and Television broadcasting classes.

Students in all courses hail from all branches of the U.S. military and Reserve as well as international military students.

Equipment maintenance courses
The Basic Television Equipment Maintenance (BTVEM) course includes apprentice level instruction in the repair of all types of studio and transmission equipment. Students also learn how to maintain the Adobe Premiere non-linear digital editing systems. The U.S. Army MOS 25R is awarded upon completion. Since December 2006 Air Force class graduated, DINFOS no longer trains Air Force personnel in the BTVEM course.

The Broadcast Radio and Television Systems Maintenance course is an advanced level course where students learn the ins and outs of American Forces Radio and Television Service (AFRTS) engineering standards and practices.

Both maintenance courses are nationally accredited by the Society of Broadcast Engineers (SBE). Upon completion of either course with an average GPA of at least 85%, students are certified by the SBE as broadcast technologists (CBT).

Notable alumni

Rob Riggle, Actor/comedian 
Al Gore, print journalist, Vietnam War
Dan Quayle
Dale Dye
Lionel Bascom, Pulitzer Prize juror in Journalism, Columbia University
Adrian Cronauer
Zsa Zsa Gershick
Chas Henry
LouAnne Johnson
Clarence Page
Rod Simmons
Marshall Thompson
James E. Whaley, Siemens Corporation, Vice President of Communications & Marketing
Earl Woods, father of golfer Tiger Woods
Mark Rosenker, Retired USAFR Major General, CBS NEWS Transportation Safety Analyst
Major Megan McClung
Gene Siskel
Tony Dow, Leave It To Beaver 
Walter F. Mondale, 42nd Vice-President of the United States. 
John William Chancellor, a television news anchor and author
Nicholas A. Basbanes, author of numerous works of nonfiction, including A Gentle Madness: Bibliophiles, Bibliomanes, and the Eternal Passion for Books and On Paper: The Everything of Its Two-Thousand-Year History; Spring 1968.
Sunny Anderson,
Jonathan Young (psychologist), commentator, Ancient Aliens series on the History Channel.
JD Vance, author of NYTimes bestseller Hillbilly Elegy.

References

External links
 

Military education and training in the United States
Educational institutions established in 1946
Organizations based in Maryland
American journalism organizations
Universities and colleges accredited by the Council on Occupational Education
1946 establishments in Maryland